Pratt Community College is a public community college in Pratt, Kansas, United States.

Athletics
The official mascot for Pratt Community College is the Beaver. Pratt CC participates in 11 sports in the NJCAA and in the Kansas Jayhawk Community College Conference.

Notable alumni
 Rod Brown, professional basketball player
 Ricky Byrdsong, college basketball coach
 Paul Stovall, professional basketball player
 Terry Tiffee, professional baseball infielder
Cecil Turner, football player (Pratt Junior College)

References

External links
 

Two-year colleges in the United States
Education in Pratt County, Kansas
Community colleges in Kansas
NJCAA athletics